"Maybe I Like It" is a song by Danish singer Ida. It was released as a Digital download in Denmark on 28 October 2013. The song has peaked to number 36 on the Danish Singles Chart. The song is included on her debut studio album Seize the Day (2013).

Music video
A music video to accompany the release of "Maybe I Like It" was first released onto YouTube on 11 November 2013 at a total length of three minutes and thirty-five seconds.

Track listing

Chart performance

Weekly charts

Release history

References

2013 songs
Ida (singer) songs
Sony Music singles
Songs written by J-Son